Palaeoamasiidae or Palaeoamasinae is an extinct taxon of embrithopod mammals that have been found in Romania and Anatolia where they lived on the shores of the Tethys Ocean.

Classification
 Palaeoamasiidae 
 Hypsamasia 
 Palaeoamasia 
 Crivadiatherium Radulesco, Iliesco &Iliesco 1976

Notes

References

 
 
  
 
 
 

Embrithopods
Eocene mammals
Eocene first appearances
Eocene extinctions
Prehistoric mammal families